Nader Galal (January 1941December 2014) was an Egyptian television and film director he was best known for directing Batal men Waraq (A Hero of Paper), El-Irhaby (The Terrorist) and El-Wad Mahrouz Beta'a El-Wazir (Mahrous, the minister's stooge).

Early life and career 
Galal was born in 1941 to an artistic family, his father was the Egyptian director Ahmed Galal and his mother was the Mary Queeny, the Egyptian actress and film producer. He obtained a bachelor's degree in Commerce in 1963, in 1964, he was graduated from the Higher Cinema Institute with a diploma in film directing.

Galal started his career in 1965 and has directed more than 50 films, best known for his work with notable actors like Adel Imam and Nadia El-Gendy.

References 

1941 births
2014 deaths
Egyptian film directors